Herman Gray is Emeritus Professor of Sociology at UC Santa Cruz and has published widely in the areas of black cultural politics and media. Gray’s books include: Watching Race (Minnesota), Cultural Moves (California).  Towards a Sociology of the Trace, (Minnesota) co-edited with Macarena Gomez Barriś, and The Sage Handbook of Television Studies co-edited with M. Alvarado, M. Buonanno and T. Miller (Sage). Gray’s 2019 book Racism, Post Race (Duke) was co-edited with Roopali Mukherjee and Sarah Banet Weiser. Gray is a member of the Board of Jurors for the Peabody Awards.

Education
Gray attended graduate school at UC Santa Cruz studying under Sociology Professor Hardy T. Frye.

Appearances
Gray appears as a talking head in Marlon Riggs's 1991 documentary film Color Adjustment.

Views
Gray has stated that nostalgia can be used to induce an uncritical engagement with history, as "a way of not having to confront ... historical realities," in particular as with the "Make America Great Again" slogan.

References

External links
 Faculty profile page at UC Santa Cruz

American sociologists

Living people

Year of birth missing (living people)
University of California, Santa Cruz faculty
University of California, Santa Cruz alumni